The fourth season of the AMC television series Hell on Wheels premiered on August 2, 2014 and comprised 13 episodes. This season continued to focus on the westward expansion of the Union Pacific Railroad. Conflicts among the government, businesses, ranchers, homesteaders, and the railroad are also depicted, as all of those interests compete with one another for control of Cheyenne, Wyoming, the most important railroad hub in 1867.

Cast

Main cast
The fourth season features eleven series regulars. Jake Weber and MacKenzie Porter are added to the main cast. Common, who plays Elam Ferguson, is not credited among the main cast until his reappearance in the episode "Bear Man".

 Anson Mount as Cullen Bohannon, a former Confederate soldier, who is imprisoned in a Mormon fort with his pregnant wife, Naomi, and must find a way out from under the Swede (12 episodes)
 Colm Meaney as Thomas C. Durant, who must figure out how to get the railroad moving without Cullen Bohannon, all the while warding off the arrival of big government that threatens to seize control of Cheyenne and his railroad (12 episodes)
 Common as Elam Ferguson, the chief of railroad police who pursued the masked gang who kidnapped Cullen, only to be mauled by a bear on the prairie and left for dead (2 episodes)
 Christopher Heyerdahl as Thor "The Swede" Gundersen, who, after stealing the identity of the patriarch of a Mormon ward, uses his new identity and power as "Bishop" to keep Cullen Bohannon as his personal prisoner (7 episodes)
 Robin McLeavy as Eva, a former Indian captive turned whore, who finds herself homeless, penniless, and alone after giving away her baby to her brother-in-law Declan Toole, and Elam Ferguson goes missing (12 episodes)
 Jennifer Ferrin as Louise Ellison, a journalist and editor of The Cheyenne Leader (daily newspaper) (9 episodes)
 Phil Burke as Mickey McGinnes, the owner of a casino and whorehouse and the honorary Mayor of Cheyenne (11 episodes) 
 Dohn Norwood as Psalms Jackson, head of a skeleton crew of freedmen who are leading the charge to break through the mountains holding the railroad's progress at bay (12 episodes)
 Kasha Kropinski as Ruth Cole, a preacher in the burgeoning city of Cheyenne. She finds new purpose as a mother to the Mormon boy Ezra. (8 episodes)
 MacKenzie Porter as Naomi Hatch Bohannon, Cullen Bohannon's wife, who struggles to build a new life, family, and home, awakening her own desire to experience adventures beyond the Mormon fort (7 episodes)
 Jake Weber as John Allen Campbell, a former Brigadier General for the Union Army, appointed provisional governor of Wyoming by Ulysses S. Grant. Campbell is determined to civilize the West and seize control of the city from railroad mogul Durant. (12 episodes)

Recurring cast
 David Wilson Barnes as Martin Delaney (10 episodes)
 Tayden Marks as Ezra Dutson (7 episodes)
 Kevin Blatch as Judge Webber (7 episodes)
 Billy Wickman as Heckard (6 episodes)
 Kevin Davet as Paddy Quinn (6 episodes)
 Chelah Horsdal as Maggie Palmer (5 episodes)
 Peter Benson as Marshal Jessup (5 episodes)
 James Shanklin as Aaron Hatch (5 episodes)
 Jonathan Scarfe as Sydney Snow (5 episodes)
 Haysam Kadri as Dutch Dufray (5 episodes)
 Michael Tiernan as Treasurer Atwood (4 episodes)
 Kirsten Robek as Mrs. Hatch (4 episodes)
 Gregg Henry as Brigham Young (4 episodes)
 Christian Sloan as Parker (4 episodes)
 Andrew Howard as Johnny Shea (3 episodes)
 Duval Lang as Elder Moss (3 episodes)
 Leon Ingulsrud as Major Bendix (3 episodes)
 Brendan Fletcher as Dultey (3 episodes)
 Sara Canning as Charlotte (3 episodes)
 Tim Guinee as Collis Huntington (2 episodes)
 John Lacy as Virgil Farnsworth  (2 episodes)
 Collin Sutton as George Van Dorn (2 episodes)

Production
On November 14, 2013, AMC renewed Hell On Wheels for a fourth season, consisting of 13 episodes, which premiered August 2, 2014. About the season, showrunner John Wirth has stated: "The consequences of the stories we told last year will continue to reverberate throughout the season, and fans can expect to see some shocking events that will not only change the lives of our characters, but the landscape of the series as the railroad continues its relentless march westward."

Casting
This season, MacKenzie Porter plays Naomi Hatch, taking over for Siobhan Williams from the third season, due to Williams' scheduling conflicts with her role on Black Box. Jake Weber joined the cast in April 2014, originally as a character named Harlan Fell, which was changed preseason to John Campbell. In May 2014, Jonathan Scarfe was cast as recurring character Sydney Snow, who introduced himself as Cullen Bohannon's old war friend.

Awards 
In 2015, the series won the Western Heritage Award for Outstanding Fictional Drama.

Episodes

References

External links 
 
 

Fiction set in 1867
2014 American television seasons
Hell on Wheels (TV series)